David Hovorka (born 7 August 1993) is a professional Czech football defender currently playing for Slavia Prague in the Fortuna Liga.

Club career 
He spent most of his youth career in Sparta Prague, arriving from SK Kročehlavy in 2002 at the age of 9.

Sparta Prague 
He entered the first team squad in 2012, but failed to make a league appearance for the club.

Loan to Hradec Králové 
In January 2014, he moved to Czech National Football League team Hradec Králové on loan with an option to buy. He made his professional league debut on 21 March 2013 in a 1–1 away draw against České Budějovice. He appeared in only seven league matches, returning to Sparta at the end of the season.

Loan to Viktoria Žižkov 
For the 2014–15 season, he moved on loan to another second-tier club, Viktoria Žižkov, for one year. He appeared in 29 league matches, scoring no goals.

Liberec 
In summer 2015, he signed a three-year deal with the Czech First League side Liberec. He made his First League debut for them on 27 July in a 4–2 home win against Mladá Boleslav. He scored his first professional league goals on 11 May 2016 in a 4–3 home win against Zlín. With Liberec, he played in the Europa League group stage in two consecutive years.

Return to Sparta Prague 
On 2 February 2017, it was announced that Hovorka, despite being seriously injured at the time, joined his former club Sparta Prague.

Loan to Jablonec 
On loan to Jablonec for one year.

Slavia Prague 
In the summer of 2019 he moved to Slavia Praha and was a starter in the Champions League match against Inter.

International career 
Despite not playing for any youth national teams, he was called up to the senior Czech national team in August 2017 to face Germany and Northern Ireland in the World Cup qualifiers.
He made his senior debut for the Czech Republic on 7 October 2020 in a friendly against Cyprus.

Career statistics

Club

Honours 
SK Slavia Prague
 Czech First League: 2019–20

References

External links 
 
 

1993 births
Living people
Czech footballers
Czech Republic international footballers
Czech First League players
AC Sparta Prague players
FC Slovan Liberec players
Association football defenders
FK Jablonec players
FC Hradec Králové players
FK Viktoria Žižkov players
Sportspeople from Kladno
SK Slavia Prague players
Czech National Football League players